Payal Kapadia may refer to:
 Payal Kapadia (author)
 Payal Kapadia (filmmaker)